Sergio Pitol Deméneghi (18 March 1933 – 12 April 2018) was a Mexican writer, translator and diplomat.  In 2005, he received the Cervantes Prize, the most prestigious literary award in the Spanish-speaking world.

Early life 
Born in Puebla, Mexico, Pitol spent his childhood in Ingenio de Potrero, a provincial town in the state of Veracruz. His mother died when he was four years old and soon after Pitol contracted malaria, which left him bedridden until about the age of 12. He was raised by his grandmother. As a teenager, Pitol moved to Córdoba, Veracruz.

Education and diplomatic work 
In 1950, Pitol moved to Mexico City to study law and literature at the Universidad Autónoma de México (UNAM). In 1960, he became a member of the Mexican Foreign Service and served over a number of years as cultural attaché in Rome, Belgrade, Warsaw, Paris, Beijing, Moscow, Prague, Budapest and Barcelona. In the 1980s, he served as ambassador to Czechoslovakia.

Later years
Since 1993, he lived in Xalapa, capital of the state of Veracruz, where he taught at the Universidad Veracruzana. His final years were spent in poor health and he had struggled in particular with progressive aphasia, which prevented him from writing or talking. He died in Xalapa on 12 April 2018, aged 85.

Writing career 
Pitol's publications as translator include literary works by such authors as Jerzy Andrzejewski, Jane Austen, Giorgio Bassani, Kazimierz Brandys, Anton Chekhov, Joseph Conrad, Witold Gombrowicz, Henry James, and Vladimir Nabokov. He also served as a professor at the UNAM, at the Universidad Veracruzana in Xalapa, and at the University of Bristol in England.

Awards 
In 2005, Pitol received the Cervantes Prize. Other major awards include the Premio Juan Rulfo (1999), Premio Herralde de Novela (1984) for El desfile del amor, and the Premio Xavier Villaurrutia (1981) for his short story, Nocturno de bujara from the collection of the same title.

Selected works

Novels 
 El tañido de una flauta (Era, Mexico City, 1972)
 Juegos florales (Siglo XXI, 1982)
 El desfile del amor (Anagrama, Barcelona 1984; The Love Parade, trans. George Henson; Deep Vellum Publishing, 2021)
 Domar a la divina garza (Anagrama, Barcelona, 1988)
 La vida conjugal (Era, Mexico City; Anagrama, Barcelona, 1991)

Essay-memoirs 
 El arte de la fuga (Era, Mexico City, 1996 (The Art of Flight, trans. George Henson; Deep Vellum Publishing, 2015)
 El viaje (Era, Mexico City, 2000 (The Journey, trans. George Henson; Deep Vellum Publishing, 2015)
 El mago de Viena (Pre-Textos, Valencia, 2005 (The Magician of Vienna, trans. George Henson; Deep Vellum Publishing, 2017) Short-story collections 
 Tiempo cercado (Editorial Estaciones, Mexico City, 1959)
 Infierno de todos (Universidad Veracruzana, Xalapa, 1964)
 Los climas (Joaquín Mortiz, Mexico City, 1966)
 No hay tal lugar (Era, Mexico City, 1967)
 Del encuentro nupcial (Tusquets, Barcelona, 1970)
 Nocturno de Bujara (Siglo XXI, Mexico City, 1981)
 Vals de Mefisto (Anagrama, Barcelona, 1984; Mephisto's Waltz, Trans. George Henson; Deep Vellum Publishing, 2019)
 El relato veneciano de Billie Upward (Monte Ávila Editores, Caracas, 1992)
 Todos los cuentos (Alfaguara, Mexico City, 1998)
 El oscuro hermano gemelo y otros relatos (Norma, Bogotá, 2004)
 Los mejores cuentos, presentación de Enrique Vila-Matas (Anagrama, Barcelona, 2005)

Further reading 

 José Balza, Victoria de Stefano, Anamari Gomis, et alii. Sergio Pitol, los territorios del viajero. Mexico City, ERA, 2000.
 Karim Benmiloud. Sergio Pitol ou le carnaval des vanités. Paris, Presses Universitaires de France, 2012.
 Karim Benmiloud, Raphaël Estève (dir.). El planeta Pitol. Bordeaux, Presses Universitaires de Bordeaux, 2012.
 José Bru (comp.). Acercamientos a Sergio Pitol. Guadalajara, Universidad de Guadalajara, 1999.
 Maricruz Castro Ricalde. Ficcion, narracion y polifonia : el universo narrativo de Sergio Pitol. 
 Laura Cazares Hernández. El caldero fáustico : la narrativa de Sergio Pitol. Mexico City, UAM, 2000.
 Texto critico n° 21, Xalapa, Universidad Veracruzana, abr.-jun. 1981.
 Pedro M. Domene. Sergio Pitol: el sueño de lo real. Batarro (revista literaria) No. 38-39-40, 2002.
 Luz Fernandez de Alba. Del tañido al arte de la fuga. Una lectura critica de Sergio Pitol. Mexico City, UNAM, 1998.
 Teresa Garcia Diaz. Del Tajin a Venecia: un regreso a ninguna parte. Xalapa, Universidad Veracruzana, 2002.
 Teresa Garcia Diaz (coord.). Victorio Ferri se hizo mago en Viena (sobre Sergio Pitol). Xalapa, Universidad Veracruzana, 2007.
 Alfonso Montelongo. Vientos troqueles : la narrativa de Sergio Pitol. Xalapa, Universidad Veracruzana, 1998.
 José Luis Nogales Baena. Hijo de todo lo visto y lo soñado: La narrativa breve de Sergio Pito. Sevilla, Consejo Superior de Investigaciones Científicas, Editorial Universidad de Sevilla, Diputación de Sevilla, 2019.
 Renato Prada Oropeza. La narrativa de Sergio Pitol : los cuentos. Xalapa, Universidad Veracruzana, 1996.
 Eduardo Serrato (comp.). Tiempo cerrado, tiempo abierto. Sergio Pitol ante la critica. Mexico City, ERA - UNAM, 1994.
 Hugo Valdés Manriquez. El laberinto cuentistico de Sergio Pitol. Monterrey, Gobierno del Estado de Nuevo León, 1998.

References

External links
CBC: Mexico's Sergio Pitol wins Cervantes lit prize
 BBC Mundo:  Cervantes para Sergio Pitol 
 Academia Mexicana de la Lengua

1933 births
2018 deaths
Mexican diplomats
Mexican novelists
Mexican male writers
Male novelists
Premio Cervantes winners
Prix Roger Caillois recipients
Mexican people of Italian descent
Mexican translators
People from Puebla